The 2017–18 Saudi Second Division was the 42nd season of the Saudi Second Division since its establishment in 1976.

The season featured 13 teams from the 2016–17 campaign, three new teams relegated from the 2016–17 First Division: Al-Adalh, Al-Jeel and Wej, and four new teams promoted from the 2016–17 Third Division: Al-Kholood as champions, Al-Hejaz as runners-up, Al-Taqadom as third place and Al-Jubail as fourth place. The league began on 19 October 2017 and ended on 17 March 2018.

Team changes
The following teams have changed division since the 2016–17 season.

To Second Division 
Promoted from 2016–17 Third Division
 Al-Kholood
 Al-Hejaz
 Al-Taqadom
 Al-Jubail

Relegated from 2016–17 First Division
 Al-Adalh
 Al-Jeel
 Wej

From Second Division 
Promoted to Prince Mohammad bin Salman League
 Al-Kawkab
 Jeddah
 Al-Mujazzal

Relegated to 2017–18 Third Division
 Sdoos
 Al-Najma
 Al-Safa
 Al-Taraji

Teams
;Group A

Group B

Group A
Table

Group B
Table

Final
The winners of each group will play a two-legged final to decide the champion of the 2017–18 Second Division. The first leg is scheduled to be played on 9 March and the second leg on 17 March.

|}

First leg

Second leg

Third place play-off
Al-Jeel, who finished 2nd in Group B will face Al-Ansar who finished 2nd in Group A for a two-legged play-off to decide the third-placed team. Al-Jeel defeated Al-Ansar 5–1 on aggregate to finish in third place.

|}

First leg

Second leg

Relegation play-offs
On March 7, 2018, the Saudi Football Federation announced that the number of teams in the Second Division was increased from 20 teams to 24 teams. The relegation was removed and in its place, they announced a relegation play-off. The bottom 2 teams in each group will face the top 4 teams outside the Quarter-finals in the Saudi Third Division.

|}

Statistics

Top scorers

Clean sheets

See also
 2017–18 Professional League
 2017–18 Prince Mohammad bin Salman League
 2018 King Cup
 2017–18 Crown Prince Cup

References

Saudi Second Division seasons
3